Double Tollgate is an unincorporated community in Clarke County, Virginia. Double Tollgate is located at the intersection of Fairfax Pike (State Route 277), Front Royal Pike (U.S. Route 522), Lord Fairfax Highway (U.S. Route 340), and Stonewall Jackson Highway (U.S. Routes 340 and 522).

Unincorporated communities in Clarke County, Virginia
Unincorporated communities in Virginia